Ladwa  is a town and a municipal committee in Kurukshetra district in the Indian state of Haryana. In 2007, Ladwa legislative assembly constituency was created comprising 126,704 registered voters and come under Kurukshetra (Lok Sabha constituency). The Member of Parliament is Nayab Saini & Member of the Legislative Assembly (India) is Mewa Singh.

Geography
It is located on the Kurukshetra - Yamunanagar - Saharanpur road and is also close to the towns of kurukshetra, Shahbad, Radaur and Indri, India. Ladwa has one of the best new grain markets all over Asia.

Tehsil
Ladwa is a tehsil in Kurukshetra district which includes Babain sub-tehsil. Ladwa tehsil includes total number of 98 villages. Ladwa includes 53 whereas Babain sub-tehsil includes 45 villages.

Villages
Villages under Ladwa—Badarpur,
Bahlolpur,
Bakali,
Ban,
Bani,
Bapda,
Bapdi,
Baraichpur,
Baraunda,
Baraundi,
Baraut,
Barshami,
Bhalar,
Bhalari,
Bharthauli,
Bhut majra,
Bir Bhartauli,
Brahan,
Budha,
Chhalaundi,
Chhapra,
Dab khera,
Dehra,
Dhandla,
Dhanora Jattan,
Dhudi,
Dudha,
Dugaheri,
Gadli,
Gajlana,
Gharaula,
Gobindgarh,
Gudha,
Halalpur,
Jainpur,
Jalaludin Majra,
Jandhera,
Jogi majra,
Kharkali,
Kheri Dabdalan,
Kishan Garh,
Ladwa,
Lathi dhanaura,
Mehra,
Mehuwa Kheri,
Murad Nagar,
Nakhrojpur,
Niwarsi,
Pahladpur,
Salempur,
Samalkha,
Shahzadpur,
Sultanpur,
Sura.

Villages under Babain—Babain,
Baghrat,
Berthla,
Bhagwanpur,
Bhaini,
Bhukhri,
Bint,
Bir Kalwa,
Bir Mangoli Sainian
Bir Sujra,
Buhavi,
Danani,
Ghisarpari,
Guhan,
Hamidpur,
Haripura,
Isherheri,
Jandaula,
Kali Rano,
Kalwa,
Kandoli,
Kanoni,
Kasithal,
Khaira,
Khairi,
Khirki Viran,
Lakhmadi,
Lohara,
Mandokhra,
Mangoly Jattan,
Mangoly Rangdan,
Phallsanda Jattan,
Phallsanda Rangdan,
Ram Nagar-112,
Ram Nagar-156,
Ram Saran Majra,
Rampura,
Rurki,
Sanghor,
Simbalwal,
Sujra,
Sujri,
Sunario,
Tatka,
Tatki.

Demographics
According to the 2011 Census of India, Ladwa has a total population of 28,887 person comprising 15,345 Males and 13,542 Females. Males constitute 53.1% and females 46.87% of the population. Ladwa has an average literacy rate of 72.3%, lower than the national average of 72.99%: male literacy is 76.3%, and female literacy is 67.8%. In Ladwa, 12.4% of the population lies between age group 0–6 years.

Crops
Paddy and wheat are the main crops which are cultivated in Ladwa in rainy season and winter season respectively. Other crops are sunflowers, sugar cane, pulses, turmeric, and maize, etc.

Education

Public schools
Government Senior Secondary School
Government Girls High School
Jawahar Navodaya Vidyalaya

Private schools
Hindu High School(Govt. Aided)
Guru Nanak High School(Govt. Aided)
Sant Nischal Singh Public School
The Discovery World School
New Janta Sr. Sec. School
Sugni Devi Arya Girls Sr. Sec. School
Om Parkash Garg Memorial Public School
Doon Public School
Unique Shiksha Niketan
Jai Bharat High School
Tagore High School
Sanjay Gandhi Memorial Public School
 GENIUS VOICE INSTITUTE
CAMBRIDGE MONTESSORY PRE-SCHOOL
SAHARA INTERNATIONAL SCHOOL

Colleges and universities
Indira Gandhi National College
Ladwa. There is easy access to colleges and universities.

Broadband Service Available in Ladwa
There are many Broadband service providers in Ladwa which provide high speed fiber internet throughout the city.
BSNL
Netplus
Falconet(Airtel Broadband)
Planet WIFI

Festivals
India is a country of festivals where every day is a new festival and people of Ladwa also celebrate many of them. The main festivals of Ladwa are:
 Dipawali is the festival of happiness which is connected with their religious history.
 Teej is celebrated by girls in which they swing again and again and distribute sweets among them.
 Holi is the festival of colour.

Public health care
Community Health Center and Primary Health Center is the only government infrastructure which serves local community. In the past few years many private hospitals have come up in the town to provide better medical facilities to the people of Ladwa.

Transportation
The diverse connection of rural roads and state highways provides well-connectivity to the city.

Airports
In addition, Chandigarh International Airport situated in the proximity of approx. , is serving few non-stop international and domestic flights.

Rail
The closest Train Stations are located at Kurukshetra, Yamunanagar, Karnal and Ambala. A new railway line from Karnal to Yamunanagar will go via Ladwa.

Road
The road transportation is provided by Haryana Roadways which runs on all the Inter State and City routes. Moreover, Village are well-connected by Bus.

References

General references
http://www.schooleducationharyana.gov.in/Schools.html
http://haryana.gov.in/
http://www.schooleducationharyana.gov.in/CBSE.html
https://web.archive.org/web/20130124014628/http://haryanahealth.nic.in/userfiles/file/pdf/Planning/DISTRICTWISE%20COMMUNITY%20%20HEALTH%20CENTRES12102012.pdf
http://www.kurukshetra.nic.in/AtAGlance/basicstat.htm

External links
Location on Bing Maps
Location on Google Maps

Cities and towns in Kurukshetra district